Blind Elephant is the second studio album by Gemstones. Malaco Records alongside Xist Music released the album on May 5, 2015.

Background
He worked with J.R., RavO (Raven-Tiffany Alishia McGriff), and Stanley Meeks.

Critical reception

Awarding the album three and a half stars from New Release Today, Kevin McNeese states, "Blind Elephant is an album that fans have waited a long time for. While lyrically he didn't disappoint, I definitely think the mixing and production could have been better." Richard Spadine, giving the album three stars at Rapzilla, writes, "Contrary to the hype, Blind Elephant is simply a good album. Not a magnum opus, but an impressive, if uneven effort from an artist still in the process of defining himself."

Track listing

Chart performance

References

2015 albums
Demarco Castle albums